The Johnson Switch Building is a historic commercial building in 3201 Main Street in Johnson, Arkansas, USA. Built in 1904, it is a single-story structure with a pressed-metal facade designed to resemble brickwork, and a gable roof obscured by a stepped parapet. Named for a nearby railroad switch, it is the oldest surviving commercial building in the small community's downtown area.

The building was listed on the National Register of Historic Places in 1999.

See also
 Johnson House and Mill
 National Register of Historic Places listings in Washington County, Arkansas

References

Commercial buildings on the National Register of Historic Places in Arkansas
Buildings designated early commercial in the National Register of Historic Places
Commercial buildings completed in 1936
National Register of Historic Places in Washington County, Arkansas
1936 establishments in Arkansas